Adeyemi Josiah Afolayan  (1940–1996) was a Nigerian actor, filmmaker, dramatist, and producer.

Early life 
Afolayan was born in 1940 in Kwara state Nigeria, he was a film actor, director, and producer. He is the brother of actress Toyin Afolayan as well as father to film actors, Kunle Afolayan, Tayo Afolayan, Gabriel Afolayan, Moji Afolayan , and Aremu Afolayan.

Career 
In 1966, Afolayan joined Moses Olaiya's drama troupe, in 1971, he left to establish his own drama group which went on to stage comedic plays.

In 1976, he appeared in Ola Balogun's Ajani Ogun and later produced and starred Ija Ominira (1979), also directed by Balogun. Kadara, also called Destiny in English was the first movie he wrote, produced and also starred as leading actor. The movie was shown at the ninth Tashkent film festival for African and Asian cinema. Afolayan went on to produce and star in other productions such as Ija Orogun, Taxi Driver and Iya ni Wura.

Selected filmography
Taxi Driver (1983)
Ajani Ogun (1976)

See also
 List of Nigerian actors

References

Nigerian male film actors
Yoruba male actors
Male actors from Kwara State
1940 births
1996 deaths
20th-century Nigerian male actors
Adeyami
Male actors in Yoruba cinema
Nigerian dramatists and playwrights
Nigerian film producers